The common slender mongoose (Herpestes sanguineus), also known as the black-tipped mongoose or the black-tailed mongoose, is a very common mongoose species native to sub-Saharan Africa.

Taxonomy 
The scientific name Herpestes sanguineus was proposed by Eduard Rüppell in 1835 who described a reddish mongoose observed in the Kordofan region.

Range and habitat
The common slender mongoose, with up to fifty subspecies, are found throughout sub-Saharan Africa, with the black mongoose of Angola and Namibia sometimes considered a separate species. They are adaptable and can live nearly anywhere in this wide range, but are most common in the savannah and semiarid plains. They are much rarer in densely forested areas and deserts.

Description

Males weigh , while the smaller females weigh .

The color of their fur varies widely between subspecies, from a dark reddish-brown to an orange red, grey, or even yellow, but these mongooses can be distinguished from other mongooses due to the prominent black or red tip on their tails. They also have silkier fur than the other African members of their family.

Behavior and ecology
The common slender mongoose generally lives either alone or in pairs. It is primarily diurnal, although it is sometimes active on warm, moonlit nights. It doesn't seem to be territorial, but will nevertheless maintain stable home ranges that are often shared with members of related species. Indeed, the common slender mongoose and these other species may even den together, as most of their relatives are nocturnal. Dens may be found anywhere sheltered from the elements: in crevices between rocks, in hollow logs, and the like.

Reproduction
A male's range will include the ranges of several females, and scent cues inform him when the female is in heat. The gestation period is believed to be 60 to 70 days, and most pregnancies result in one to three (usually two) young. The male does not help care for them. Unusually, for a solitary species, in the Kalahari the males are philopatric whereas the females disperse. This is thought to be due to the benefits of kin cooperation by males in defence of females.

Feeding

The common slender mongoose is primarily carnivorous, though it is an opportunistic omnivore. Insects make up the bulk of its diet, but lizards, rodents, snakes, birds, amphibians, and the occasional fruit are eaten when available. It will also eat carrion and eggs. As befits the popular image of mongooses, the slender mongoose is capable of killing and subsequently eating venomous snakes, but such snakes do not constitute a significant portion of its diet.

Common slender mongooses are more adept at climbing trees than other mongooses, often hunting birds there.

Conservation
The common slender mongoose has been targeted by extermination efforts in the past, due to its potential to be a rabies vector and the fact that it sometimes kills domestic poultry. These efforts have not been conspicuously successful, although some subspecies may be threatened. It is in no immediate danger of extinction, and is IUCN Red Listed as least concern.

References

External links

 University of Michigan's Animal Diversity Web
 WildlifeSafari.info identification guide

Herpestes
Mongooses of Sub-Saharan Africa
Mammals described in 1836